Credentials is a play by David Williamson. It had its premiere at La Mama in 2017 and was part of that theatre's 50th anniversary celebrations.

Plot
Chrissie is working as an ambulance paramedic. Thee director of paramedical services discovers that her qualifications are totally faked.

Reception
The Sydney Morning Herald reviewing the 2017 Melbourne production said the play "has meat for actors to sink their teeth into" and "Any new Williamson play attracts wide interest, and this is a better, riskier, and more ambitious work than anything he's written recently."

References

External links
Credentials at Ausstage

Plays by David Williamson
2017 plays